Return The Pearl To Thee (1987) is a very popular 40 episodes TV series produced by China Television starring Damian Lau and Su Ming-Ming (蘇明明).

The original producer Young Pei-pei reproduced it into a 44 episodes TV series Torn Between Two Lovers (新还君明珠) (2008) in Mainland China starring Dong Jie (董洁) and Li Zhonghan (李宗翰).

Plot
Pearl, a daughter of the many wives of a Qing official meet a friend of her boyfriend. The man also loves her and finds himself the arranged husband of the woman and decide to revoke it. He already has a girlfriend. His younger brother, knowing that, tricks to make Pearl marry to him and force the other two to leave. The two take revenge and then find they are wrong.

References

Taiwanese drama television series